Elysian, Elysium, or Elysian Fields of Ancient Greek mythology, was a conception of the afterlife in Ancient Greek mythology where mortals related to the gods, the heroic and the virtuous, could rest in a blessed and happy life after death. 

Elysian may also refer to:

 Elysian, Chicago, a 60-story skyscraper
 Elysian, Minnesota, a city, United States
 Lake Elysian, Minnesota, an unincorporated community, United States
 The Elysian, a 17-storey skyscraper in Cork, Ireland
 Elysian Brewing Company, a brewery in Seattle, Washington, United States
 Elysian, an Armstrong Whitworth Ensign aircraft
 MY Elysian, a yacht built in 2014 by Lürssen

See also
 Elysian Charter School, Hoboken, New Jersey
 Elysian Fields (disambiguation)
 Elysian Heights, Los Angeles, California
 Elysian Park, a park in Los Angeles, California
 Elysian Township, Le Sueur County, Minnesota
 Elysian Valley, Los Angeles, California